Magic Love & Dreams is the debut EP by Magic Wands, released May 25, 2009 on the Bright Antenna label. The album was made available as a digital download, CD and a limited-edition 12" picture disc. It was released in the UK on July 6, 2009 by Young and Lost Club Records on standard black vinyl 12" with an extra track.

Track listing

US/Japan release
Black Magic - 2:35
Starships - 3:17
Teenage Love - 3:17 
Kiss Me Dead - 3:14

UK release
Kiss Me Dead - 3:14
Warrior - 3:24
Black Magic - 2:35
Teenage Love - 3:17 
Starships - 3:17

References

2009 EPs